Kabus 22 is a 3D horror–action game set in Kadıköy district in Istanbul. The player has three characters to control; the Turkish soldier Demir, his girlfriend Ebru and the mysterious Inzar. These characters have to fight against a despotic religious order and creatures named Maduns in an alternate near future.

Promotion
K22: Demolition Day is a free FPS/arcade minigame. It is a promotion for horror–action PC CD-ROM game Kabus 22. The minigame was released on October 21, 2007. A player can either create an account and try to beat other players' records, or can play offline.

References

External links
 Official Website
 
 Official demo, Gamers Hell 
 Trailer, GameTrailers.com 

2006 video games
3D GameStudio games
2000s horror video games
Third-person shooters
Turkey-exclusive video games
Video games developed in Turkey
Windows games
Windows-only games